Charles Barry Jackson (2 February 1938 – 7 November 2021) was an English footballer who played as a defender, making 482 league appearances for York City.

Career
Jackson started his career as a forward, playing in school and minor league football in York. He joined York City as an amateur in the summer of 1956 and turned professional in December. His first game for the club was a pre-season practice match in August 1956. Jackson spent his first two seasons at the club in the reserve side and made his debut for the first team in a 1–0 win against Oldham Athletic on the opening day of the 1958–59 season.

He helped the club to promotion on two occasions, for the 1958–59 and 1964–65 seasons. During the 1969–70 season, in three games against Cardiff City in the FA Cup, he snuffed out the young John Toshack. He was given an eight-week suspension after being sent off against Scunthorpe United in January 1970.

Jackson was given a testimonial against Hull City in February 1970. He was released by the club at the end of that season. Jackson joined Scarborough for a short period, after which he worked for the electricity board before retiring. He bought a sweet shop across from Bootham Crescent.

Jackson holds the record for York City appearances, having played in 539 matches in all competitions; his nephew John Pickering holds the equivalent record at Halifax Town.

He was named as York City's greatest player ever by the PFA.

Personal life
Jackson died after a long illness on 7 November 2021, at the age of 83.

References 

1938 births
2021 deaths
People from Askrigg
Footballers from Yorkshire
Footballers from North Yorkshire
English footballers
Association football defenders
York City F.C. players
Scarborough F.C. players
English Football League players